Facundo Nahuel Tenaglia (born 21 February 1996) is an Argentine professional footballer who plays as a defender for Spanish club Deportivo Alavés, on loan from Talleres.

Career
Tenaglia began his youth career with Argentino de Saladillo, prior to becoming a member of the Boca Juniors system and then having subsequent spells with Deportivo La Lola and Huracán de Saladillo. In 2014, Tenaglia joined Atlanta. Two years later, in October 2016, he made his senior career debut during a Primera B Metropolitana fixture with San Telmo. He made nineteen league appearances in 2016–17 as Atlanta reached the promotion play-offs, before losing in round one to Deportivo Español; which was Tenaglia's final game for the club, he was sent off in the 89th minute. On 23 August 2017, Talleres completed the signing of Tenaglia.

Tenaglia made his debut for Talleres on 10 December 2017, in a 0–2 victory away to Colón in the Argentine Primera División. He scored his first goal on 29 September 2019, netting his team's first in a 2–3 away loss against Independiente.

Career statistics
.

References

External links

1996 births
Living people
Sportspeople from Buenos Aires Province
Argentine people of Italian descent
Argentine footballers
Association football defenders
Primera B Metropolitana players
Argentine Primera División players
La Liga players
Club Atlético Atlanta footballers
Talleres de Córdoba footballers
Deportivo Alavés players
Argentine expatriate footballers
Argentine expatriate sportspeople in Spain
Expatriate footballers in Spain